John Wiley Hill (November 26, 1890 – March 17, 1977) was an American public relations executive. He co-founded Hill & Knowlton with Donald Knowlton in 1933.

Life and career
Hill worked as a journalist for 18 years, eventually becoming an editor and financial columnist. Hill moved to public relations in 1927, opening a firm in Cleveland, Ohio. In 1933, he brought in Donald Knowlton and began their firm. It eventually became the world's largest public relations firm.

Hill was the mastermind behind a plan called , designed to sow doubt in the minds of the public about the threats of tobacco smoking. The campaign paid scientists to publicly counter the claims of other scientists who said that smoking led to lung cancer. These scientists then later falsely testified to that effect in court when they were sued by smokers who were dying or suffering from lung-related illnesses due to smoking.

Hill died in Manhattan of a brain tumor.

References

External links
 John W. Hill (r) and Don S. Knowlton, of the public relations firm of Hill & Knowlton, giving testimony before the Senate Civil Liberties Committee on steel company public relations campaign via United States Library of Congress
 John Wiley Hill (1890 - 1977) via Public Relations Society of America

1890 births
1977 deaths
Public relations pioneers
People from Shelbyville, Indiana